Kirill Aleksandrovich Pavlov (born 30 January 1990) is a Russian former professional footballer.

Club career
He made his debut in the Russian Premier League on 2 August 2009 for FC Lokomotiv Moscow in a game against FC Rostov.

External links

References

1990 births
Living people
Russian footballers
Association football defenders
FC Lokomotiv Moscow players
FC Solyaris Moscow players
Russian Premier League players
FC Novokuznetsk players